Piz Pombi (also known as Pizzo Forato) is a mountain of the Lepontine Alps, located on the Swiss-Italian border. It overlooks Soazza on its western side.

References

External links
 Piz Pombi on Hikr

Mountains of the Alps
Mountains of Graubünden
Mountains of Lombardy
Italy–Switzerland border
International mountains of Europe
Lepontine Alps
Mountains of Switzerland
Soazza